Guzmania bakeri is a plant species in the genus Guzmania. This species is native to Ecuador and Colombia.

References

bakeri
Plants described in 1889
Flora of Colombia
Flora of Ecuador